Pozondón is a municipality located in the province of Teruel, Aragon, Spain. According to the 2004 census (INE), the municipality has a population of 97 inhabitants.

In the plains of Pozondón there are several types of sinkholes.

References 

Municipalities in the Province of Teruel